Finn's weaver (Ploceus megarhynchus), also known as Finn's baya and yellow weaver is a weaver bird species native to the Ganges and Brahmaputra valleys in India and Nepal. Two subspecies are known; the nominate subspecies occurs in the Kumaon area and salimalii in the eastern Terai.

The species was described and given its binomial name by Allan Octavian Hume based on a specimen obtained at Kaladhungi near Nainital.

Etymology 

The species was called "Eastern baya" by Oates in 1889 and called Finn's baya after Frank Finn by E. C. Stuart Baker in 1925.

Distribution and habitat 
Finn's weaver was first observed in Shuklaphanta National Park in May 1996 and is a regular summer visitor.

Behaviour and ecology
Finn's weaver breeds from May to September. It builds a nest on top of trees or in reeds. The nest is different in structure from the other weaver species found in India, but as in other weavers, woven from thin strips of leaves and reeds. This species lines the entire inside of the nest, unlike the other weavers, which line only the floor of the nest. Males strip the leaves of the nest tree, making the globular nests clearly visible.

References

Other references
 Abdulali, H. (1954) More notes on Finn's Baya (Ploceus megarhynchus). Journal of the Bombay Natural History 52(2&3): 599–601.
 Abdulali, H. (1961) The nesting habits of the eastern race of Finn's Baya Ploceus megarhynchus salimalii (Abdulali). Journal of the Bombay Natural History 58(1): 269–270.
 Ali, S. (1935) Mainly in quest of Finn's Baya. Indian Forester 41(6): 365–374.
 Ali, S., Crook, J. H. (1959) Observations on Finn's Baya (Ploceus megarhynchus Hume) rediscovered in the Kumaon terai, 1959.Journal of the Bombay Natural History 56(3): 457–483.
 Ambedkar, V.C. (1968) Observations on the breeding biology of Finn's Baya (Ploceus megarhynchus Hume) in the Kumaon Terai. Journal of the Bombay Natural History 65(3): 596–607.
 Hart, W.C. (1937) Finn's Baya Ploceus megarhyncheus Hume). Indian Forester 43(1): 45–46.
 O'Donell, H.V. (1916) The Eastern Baya Ploceus megarynchus nesting in the same tree as the Jungle Bee Apis indicus. Journal of the Bombay Natural History 24(4): 821.
 Rai, Y. M. (1979) Observations on Finn's Baya breeding near Meerut. Newsletter for Birdwatchers 19(11): 11.
 Rai, Y.M. (1979) Finn's Baya breeding at Meerut. Newsletter for Birdwatchers 19(7): 11.
 Rai, Y.M. (1983) Hastinapur birds: Finn's Baya; Tawny Eagle; Crested Honey-Buzzard. Newsletter for Birdwatchers 23(7-8): 14–15.
 Saha, S.S. (1967) The Finn's Baya Ploceus megarhynchus Hume [Aves: Passeriformes: Ploceidae] and its breeding colony near Calcutta. Proc. Zoological Society Calcutta 20: 181–185.
 Saha, S.S. (1976) Occurrence of Finn's Baya (Ploceus megarhynchus Hume) in Darrang District, Assam. Journal of the Bombay Natural History 73(3): 527–529.

External links
 Finn's weaver -  Species text in Weaver Watch.

Finn's weaver
Birds of India
Birds of Nepal
Birds of Northeast India
Finn's weaver